Jabot (foaled 1931 in Kentucky) was an American Thoroughbred racemare who won several stakes races and set a new Santa Anita Park track record in winning the San Carlos Handicap over 13 of the premier stake racers in the country. Her place in racing history was accentuated as the dam of the 1951 American Horse of the Year, Counterpoint.

Bred and raced by Cornelius Vanderbilt Whitney, Jabot was trained by the father and son team of Tom and John Healey.

Breeding
Jabot was a full sister to Cravat, a record-setting colt who won on both dirt and turf racecourses. They were sired by Sickle, a British Champion Two-Year-Old Colt who would become a two-time leading sire in North America. Sickle was a son of the important sire Phalaris, a two-time leading sire in Great Britain and Ireland. Jabot and Cravat's dam was Frilette, a daughter of the legendary U.S. Racing Hall of Fame inductee Man o' War.

Pedigree

References

1931 racehorse births
Thoroughbred racehorses
Racehorses bred in Kentucky
Racehorses trained in the United States
Horse racing track record setters
American racehorses
Thoroughbred family A1